Albert Joseph Hulsebosch (April 7, 1897 – January 5, 1982) was an American track and field athlete who competed in the 1920 Summer Olympics. He was born in Bergenfield, New Jersey and died in South Chatham, Massachusetts. In 1920 he finished sixth in the 3000 metre steeplechase event.

References

External links

1897 births
1982 deaths
People from Bergenfield, New Jersey
Sportspeople from Bergen County, New Jersey
Track and field athletes from New Jersey
American male steeplechase runners
Olympic track and field athletes of the United States
Athletes (track and field) at the 1920 Summer Olympics